The Madagascarn women's national rugby union sevens team is Madagascar's representative in women's rugby sevens.

Madagascar competed at the 2020 Women's Rugby Sevens Final Olympic Qualification Tournament. They had placed third at the 2019 Africa Women's Sevens allowing them to compete at the final Olympic Qualification Tournament.

Madagascar made their first World Cup appearance in 2022, as they had reached the final of the 2022 Africa Women's Sevens held in Tunisia, only being narrowly defeated 14-15 by South Africa.

Tournament History

Rugby World Cup Sevens

Summer Olympics

Women's Africa Cup Sevens

See also
Rugby union in Madagascar

References

Women's national rugby sevens teams
W